Raško Konjević (Montenegrin Cyrillic: Рашко Коњевић; born on 12 April 1979 in Zenica, Bosnia and Herzegovina) is a Montenegrin politician serving as the deputy prime minister of Montenegro and the minister of defence since 28 April 2022. He is the current president of the centre-left Social Democratic Party (SDP). He previously served as the member of the Parliament of Montenegro.

Biography 
Konjević graduated and obtained a master's degree at the Faculty of Economics at the University of Montenegro. He was a Minister of Interior Affairs in cabinet of Igor Lukšić (2010–2012) and in 6th cabinet of Milo Đukanović (2012–16) and later Minister of Finance in the provisional Government of Montenegro that lasted from May to November 2016. Following the October 2016 parliamentary election, he was elected Member of Parliament. He was elected MP once again in 2020.

Since 28 April 2022, he has been serving as the deputy prime minister of Montenegro and the minister of defence in the minority government of Dritan Abazović.

References

1979 births
Defence ministers of Montenegro
Deputy Prime Ministers of Montenegro
Finance ministers of Montenegro
Living people
Politicians from Zenica
Social Democratic Party of Montenegro politicians
University of Montenegro alumni
Interior ministers of Montenegro